Johannes Wilhelm Meinhold (27 February 1797 – 30 November 1851) was a Pomeranian priest and author.

Life

Meinhold was born in Lütow on the island of Usedom, where his father Georg Wilhelm Meinhold (1767–1728) was a Lutheran priest.

Growing up in the atmosphere of the Napoleonic Wars, he enrolled as a student at  the University of Greifswald in  Swedish Pomerania in the fall of 1813. After his theological education, he was priest in Koserow on Usedom from 1821 until 1827. For the next 17 years, he was priest in Krummin, also on Usedom, before he relocated to Farther Pomerania.

He retired early on account of his insubordinate behavior and died in 1851 in Berlin-Charlottenburg.

Meinhold was a poet, playwright, and novelist.

Works
Meinhold's best known works are two historical Gothic romance novels:

 Maria Schweidler, die Bernsteinhexe, which was first published anonymously in 1838. It was  translated into English as The Amber Witch by Lucie, Lady Duff-Gordon (1821–1869) in 1843.
 Sidonia von Bork, die Klosterhexe (1847), which was translated into English as Sidonia the Sorceress by Jane Wilde, the mother of Oscar Wilde, in 1849. The book was printed by William Morris' Kelmscott Press in 1894. (See Sidonia von Borcke.)

References

Source list

External links
 Sidonia von Bork die Klosterhexe, original German Text 1847-1848
 
 
 
 

1797 births
1851 deaths
People from Vorpommern-Greifswald
German historical novelists
Romanticism
People from the Province of Pomerania
German male novelists
19th-century German novelists